is a theme park in Onna, Okinawa. It is known for using machine translated English in its website.

Attractions
Ryukyu village contains ten traditional houses from different parts of Okinawa. Each was disassembled for transportation and reassembled at the park. The park staff all dress in traditional Ryukyuan attire and carry out the daily work of weaving cloth, grinding sugar cane, and Eisa dance.

References

Onna, Okinawa
Amusement parks in Japan